The 2020 Orlando Pride season was Orlando Pride's fifth season in the National Women's Soccer League, the top division of women's soccer in the United States.

Notable events
In October 2019, Alex Morgan announced she was pregnant and expecting to give birth in April 2020. Morgan had stated she aimed to return to playing in time for the Olympics with the United States in July 2020 but the games were eventually postponed by COVID-19. Morgan gave birth on May 7, 2020. 

Five Pride players signed with Australian W-League teams to play with during the 2019–20 NWSL offseason: Emily van Egmond and Claire Emslie joined Melbourne City, Alanna Kennedy joined Sydney FC, Carson Pickett joined Brisbane Roar and Camila joined Canberra United. Van Egmond and Emslie won both the Premiership and Championship titles with Melbourne City as van Egmond also led the team in goals with six.

On November 5, 2019, Orlando used its top priority to acquire the NWSL rights to Australian midfielder Chloe Logarzo off the NWSL Re-Entry Wire. On November 13, the pick was voided after the league realized Logarzo should not have been made available for selection and allowed to go through the re-entry process. The Pride was not offered compensation. Logarzo subsequently signed in England with Bristol City.

In January 2020, the Pride announced that NWSL President Amanda Duffy was to step down in order to become the team's Executive Vice President. General Manager Erik Ustruck returned to Orlando City's front office staff after only a year in the role.

In March, the start of the season was delayed indefinitely due to the coronavirus pandemic. On May 8, the NWSL allowed voluntary individual workouts on outdoor fields for the first time since the suspension.

On May 27, 2020, the NWSL announced the 2020 NWSL Challenge Cup as a smaller format replacement to the league, a 25-game tournament hosted at Zions Bank Stadium in Herriman, Utah, beginning June 27, 71 days after the original planned start date of the regular season. On June 22, the team withdrew from the tournament following positive COVID-19 tests among both players and staff.

Orlando ultimately played for the first time in 2020 on September 19 as part of the Fall Series friendlies, 343 days since the team's last match on October 12, 2019.

Roster 
.

Staff 
.

Match results

Preseason
As per the league schedule, NWSL teams were permitted to begin preseason activities on March 9, 2020. Orlando Pride were due to play three friendlies in preseason, all against Florida college teams. However, on March 12 it was announced that the NWSL's preseason schedule had been canceled on the advice of public health authorities due to the coronavirus pandemic.

National Women's Soccer League

Results

2020 NWSL Challenge Cup 
The format of the tournament was supposed to feature all nine NWSL clubs each playing four games in the preliminary rounds to determine seeding. The top eight teams would advance to a knockout bracket. The draw for the preliminary round was held on June 1, randomly assigning teams to their opposition via seeding. Orlando were drawn against Chicago, Portland and North Carolina, the top three placed teams from the previous season as well as Sky Blue. However, on June 22, the team confirmed they would be withdrawing from the tournament following positive COVID-19 tests among both players and staff.

Fall Series 
To compensate for the lack of competitive schedule and difficulty of travel, the NWSL grouped teams into regional pods to allow for a Fall Series in September and October. Orlando were grouped in the south region with reigning NWSL champions North Carolina and 2020 Challenge Cup winners Houston.

Squad statistics

Appearances

Goalscorers

Shutouts

Disciplinary record

Transfers and loans

2020 NWSL College Draft 

Draft picks are not automatically signed to the team roster. The 2020 college draft was held on January 16, 2020. Orlando had seven selections.

Transfers in

Transfers out

Loans out

Preseason trialists 
Orlando Pride began preseason training on March 9, 2020. The squad included six non-roster invitees on trial with the team during preseason. In June, Brittany Wilson was signed to a short-term contract for the 2020 NWSL Challenge Cup before being signed through 2021 with an option for the 2022 season in September.

References

External links 

 

2020 National Women's Soccer League season
2020
American soccer clubs 2020 season
2020 in sports in Florida